Bila Tserkva is a village in Tiachiv Raion, Zakarpattia Oblast, Ukraine. It belongs to Solotvyno rural hromada, one of the hromadas of Ukraine.

Romanian became in September 2012 a regional language in the village of Bila Tserkva; meaning it was allowed to be used in the towns administrative office work and documents. This was made possible after new legislation on languages in Ukraine was passed in the summer of 2012. The Constitutional Court of Ukraine on 28 February 2018 ruled this legislation unconstitutional.

References 

Villages in Tiachiv Raion